Steve W. Robinson (born January 4, 1941) is an American bridge player from Arlington, Virginia. Robinson has won three world championships and 24 North American Bridge Championships. He was inducted into the ACBL Hall of Fame in 2003.

Robinson is the author of a book, Washington Standard.

Robinson is a graduate of University of Maryland and lives in Washington, D.C..

Bridge accomplishments

Honors
 ACBL Hall of Fame, 2003

Awards
 Herman Trophy (1) 1972
 Mott-Smith Trophy (1) 1987

Wins
 d'Orsi Senior Bowl (1) 2003 
 Rosenblum Cup (1) 1986 
 World Olympiad Seniors Teams Championship (1) 2000
 North American Bridge Championships (24)
 Lebhar IMP Pairs (1) 2001 
 Rockwell Mixed Pairs (1) 1985 
 Wernher Open Pairs (1) 1972 
 Blue Ribbon Pairs (2) 1973, 1975 
 North American Pairs (3) 1985, 2016, 2017 
 Grand National Teams (3) 1984, 1988, 1992 
 Jacoby Open Swiss Teams (2) 1986, 2012 
 Vanderbilt (3) 1987, 1991, 1997 
 Senior Knockout Teams (1) 2012 
 Keohane North American Swiss Teams (1) 2013 
 Mitchell Board-a-Match Teams (3) 1978, 1989, 1994 
 Chicago Mixed Board-a-Match (1) 2004 
 Reisinger (2) 1972, 1986

Runners-up
 d'Orsi Senior Bowl (1) 2011 
 North American Bridge Championships (19)
 von Zedtwitz Life Master Pairs (1) 1987 
 Lebhar IMP Pairs (1) 2004 
 Wernher Open Pairs (2) 1973, 1974 
 Blue Ribbon Pairs (1) 1982 
 Nail Life Master Open Pairs (3) 1971, 1972, 1994 
 Grand National Teams (3) 1977, 1985, 2011 
 Vanderbilt (2) 1992, 1999 
 Mitchell Board-a-Match Teams (2) 1973, 1974 
 Chicago Mixed Board-a-Match (1) 1973 
 Spingold (3) 1979, 1992, 1996

References

External links
  – with video interview
 

1941 births
American contract bridge players
University of Maryland, College Park alumni
People from Arlington County, Virginia
Living people
Date of birth missing (living people)
Place of birth missing (living people)